Eric Raymond Gilliland is an American television producer, writer, actor and whistler.

Early life
Gilliland was born and raised in Glenview, Illinois, United States. He graduated from Glenbrook South High School in 1980 and from Northwestern University School of Communication in 1984.

Television

Film

Music
Gilliland is an accomplished whistler.  His whistling has appeared on Sam Winch's The Lullabadeer, a number of Sumack albums, and on the soundtrack for an episode of Penn & Teller: Bullshit!. He also provided whistling accompaniment to Martha Plimpton's performance of Thunder Road on NPR's Studio 360.

References

External links
 
 screen writers colony profile
 YouTube channel of "vlogs"

Living people
American television producers
American television writers
American male television writers
American male television actors
Year of birth missing (living people)
Northwestern University School of Communication alumni